Vostox is a genus of little earwigs in the family Spongiphoridae. There are more than 20 described species in Vostox.

Species
These 24 species belong to the genus Vostox:

 Vostox americanus Steinmann, 1975
 Vostox apicedentatus (Caudell, 1904) (toothed earwig)
 Vostox asemus (Hebard, 1921)
 Vostox basalis (Burr, 1912)
 Vostox bertonii (Borelli, 1905)
 Vostox binotatus (Kirby, 1891)
 Vostox bolivianus Brindle, 1971
 Vostox brasilianus Steinmann, 1975
 Vostox brunneipennis (Audinet-Serville, 1838)
 Vostox cabrerae Rehn, 1925
 Vostox carinatus Brindle, 1977
 Vostox comitatus Steinmann, 1989
 Vostox confusus (Borelli, 1905)
 Vostox dentatus Brindle, 1988
 Vostox dubius (Moreira, 1931)
 Vostox dugueti Borelli, 1912
 Vostox ecuadorensis Steinmann, 1975
 Vostox excavatus Nutting & Gurney, 1961
 Vostox magnus Brindle, 1988
 Vostox ocellatus Brindle, 1971
 Vostox quadripunctatus Brindle, 1971
 Vostox recurrens (Burr, 1912)
 Vostox similis (de Bormans, 1883)
 Vostox vicinus (Burr, 1912)

References

Further reading

External links

 

Earwigs
Articles created by Qbugbot